Sligo Creek Trail is a paved hiker-biker trail running along Sligo Creek in the suburbs of Washington, D.C. Most of the trail passes through tree-filled parkland. The trail and surrounding park is a popular place for locals to jog, walk, bicycle, roller-skate, and take their children to the playground. Many local families enjoy picnicking at one of the 15 picnic areas along the trail.

Where's the trail? 

Heading upstream from southeast (closest to DC) to northwest (farthest from DC):

It begins at the intersection with the Northwest Branch Trail of the Anacostia Tributary Trail System, crosses Riggs Road, passes behind the Parklawn Community Recreational Center, crosses East-West Highway and ends in Carole Highlands.

Junction list
It begins in Carole Highlands and ends inside the Wheaton Regional Recreation Park (WRRP).

Between Carole Highlands and WRRP, Sligo Creek Trail crosses (in this order):
New Hampshire Avenue
(passes underneath Carroll Avenue)
Maple Avenue
Piney Branch Road
Wayne Avenue
Colesville Road
(passes underneath the Capital Beltway)
Forest Glen Road
Dennis Avenue
University Boulevard
(crosses Arcola Avenue via a trail connector)

See also 

Sligo Creek Parkway
Anacostia Tributary Trails
Metropolitan Branch Trail

External links 
Detailed trail map; covers only Carole Highlands to WRRP (Montgomery County)
Less detailed map that covers the Prince George's County portion of the trail plus other connecting trails in the Anacostia system
Mileage between landmarks along the entire Sligo Creek Trail, both counties
Info on many DC area bike trails, including Sligo Creek Trail
Friends of Sligo Creek

Hiking trails in Maryland
Protected areas of Prince George's County, Maryland
Protected areas of Montgomery County, Maryland
National Recreation Trails in Maryland